Warrior is a six-part 2018 Danish-language miniseries created by Christoffer Boe and starring Dar Salim, Danica Curcic and Lars Ranthe. The plot revolves around war veterans, bikers and the police force in a burgeoning turf war brewing between rival organized crime gangs. Copenhagen's police detective Louise (Danica Curcic) asks the war veteran CC (Dar Salim) to infiltrate the biker gang the Wolves.

It was released on October 8, 2018 on TV 2.

Cast
 Dar Salim as CC
 Danica Curcic as Louise
 Lars Ranthe as Tom
 Jakob Oftebro as Peter
 Søren Malling as Finn
 Marco Ilsø as Mads
 Jens Ferdinand Holmberg as Max
 Steffen Brink Jensen as Påfuglen
 Kenneth M. Christensen as Røde
 Jan Brandi as MK
 Niclas Patrick Bonfils as Mik
 Kasper Leisner as Henrik
 Karina Fogh Holmkjær as Joy
 Jens Erik Meier as Biker
 Natalie Madueño as Camilia

Release
Warrior was released on TV 2 on October 8, 2018.

References

External links
 
 
 

2010s Danish television series
2018 Danish television series debuts
Danish-language television shows
Works about organized crime in Denmark
Works about outlaw motorcycle clubs
TV 2 (Denmark) original programming